Pavel Simigin (July 26, 1968, Komsomolsk-on-Amur, Khabarovsk Krai) is a Russian political figure, deputy of the 8th State Dumas. 

From 2004 to 2014, Simigin held the position of commercial director of the "Singapore" company. From 2006 to 2009, he worked as an assistant to the deputy of the Komsomolsk-on-Amur State Duma of the 5th convocation. On September 14, 2014, he was elected deputy of the Legislative Duma of Khabarovsk Krai of the 6th convocation. Since September 2021, he has served as deputy of the 8th State Duma.

References

1968 births
Living people
United Russia politicians
21st-century Russian politicians
Eighth convocation members of the State Duma (Russian Federation)